Mingus Union High School is a high school in Cottonwood, Arizona. It is one of two high schools in the Mingus Union High School District. The other school, Mingus Online Academy, is a computer based alternative school at the same location.

Mingus Union High School is a Title I school serving the Cottonwood, Camp Verde, Beaver Creek, and Sedona areas.

History
There were once three separate high schools in the Verde Valley of Arizona — Jerome, Clarkdale and Cottonwood. In 1950, Jerome and Clarkdale consolidated into "Mingus High School", and in 1958, Cottonwood High School was added, creating the new Mingus Union High School.

Citizens pushed to create a new high school district instead of consolidating both the Jerome-Clarkdale and Cottonwood school districts completely. This happened in 1957 and 1958. The school district briefly took the "Union High School District" name, but this was changed to the present Mingus Union before the district became official.

The high school was located in Clarkdale until 1960. From then until the start of the 1972 school year, it was housed in Jerome's school buildings. It then moved to Cottonwood.

Operations
 the school has different colors for badges of upperclassman (grades 11–12) and underclassman (grades 9–10) students. The school requires people who would otherwise be upperclassmen to wear the ID colors of underclassmen if they lack sufficient credits. The Phoenix New Times printed an article discussing a parent's concerns that this could indirectly lead to shaming of some students; the family contacted the ACLU to get a remedy.

Notable alumni
 Jeff Huson, former MLB player (Montreal Expos, Texas Rangers, Baltimore Orioles, Milwaukee Brewers, Seattle Mariners, Anaheim Angels, Chicago Cubs)

References

Public high schools in Arizona
School districts established in 1958
Schools in Yavapai County, Arizona
1958 establishments in Arizona